McFingal: a modern epic poem. Or, The town-meeting is a mock epic poem written by American poet John Trumbull.

This canto, about 1500 lines, contains some verses from Thomas Gage's Proclamation, published in the Connecticut Courant for the 7th and the 14th of August 1775; it portrays a Scottish Loyalist, McFingal, and his Whig opponent, Honorius, evidently a portrait of John Adams. This first canto was divided into two, and with a third and a fourth canto was published in 1782.

1st edition
Philadelphia: Printed and sold by William and Thomas Bradford, at the London coffee-house. 1775.

References

Mock-heroic English poems
1770s poems